Brigadier-General Donald Robert Agnew,  (October 25, 1897 – August 7 1968)  was a Canadian general and educator.

Family
Agnew was born in Toronto on October 25, 1897 to Major John Agnew and Daisy Edith Stocks. Following the death of Daisy Edith Stocks in 1902, Major John Agnew married Elizabeth Dickenson, of Toronto.
Major John Agnew, 127th Battalion, Canadian Infantry, served overseas in World War I, along with his three sons,  Lt. Donald Agnew, of the Canadian Reserve Artillery, Lt. Ellis Agnew, 351 Brigade R.F.A., and Lt. Ronald Agnew, of the Royal Canadian Navy. While her husband and sons were overseas during the war, Mrs. Elizabeth Agnew moved temporarily to Hamilton, Ont.

Education
Agnew was educated at the University of Toronto Schools. He studied at the RMC, student # 1137 in 1915.

Career
He returned to RMC in Kingston as Commandant and ADC to the Governor-General (1947–54). At the time, RMC was the only military college with a four-year course, the course was 15 percent military content. During this period, the New One Hundred Opening Ceremonies were held (20 September 1948). He devised a new system of organization at RMC consisting of a vice-commandant as director of studies, to coordinate the military and academic training at RMC and to represent RMC at the National Conference of Canadian Universities as the equivalent of a vce-principal. The commandant personally commanded the cadet battalion. A staff-adjutant issued the routine orders.

He presided over the New One Hundred Opening Ceremonies at the RMC on 20 September 1948. He inaugurated the Old Brigade, for alumni celebrating 50 years since they entered one of the Canadian Royal Military Colleges in 1950. He was photographed as Commandant of RMC when Queen Elizabeth II, who was known as Princess Elizabeth before her accession, and Prince Philip visited on 12 October 1951.

Lieutenant-General Stuart's Major Appointments

References

4237 Dr. Adrian Preston & Peter Dennis (Edited) "Swords and Covenants" Rowman And Littlefield, London. Croom Helm. 1976.
H16511 Dr. Richard Arthur Preston "To Serve Canada: A History of the Royal Military College of Canada" 1997 Toronto, University of Toronto Press, 1969.
H16511 Dr. Richard Arthur Preston "Canada's RMC - A History of Royal Military College" Second Edition 1982
H1877 R. Guy C. Smith (editor) "As You Were! Ex-Cadets Remember". In 2 Volumes. Volume I: 1876-1918. Volume II: 1919-1984. Royal Military College. [Kingston]. The R.M.C. Club of Canada. 1984
Generals of World War II
 The Agnew family fonds 1912-19, McMaster University
 RMC Club of Canada Newsletter

1897 births
1968 deaths
Canadian generals
Canadian military personnel from Ontario
Canadian Companions of the Order of the Bath
Canadian Commanders of the Order of the British Empire
Royal Military College of Canada alumni
Commandants of the Royal Military College of Canada
Canadian Expeditionary Force officers
Canadian military personnel of World War I
Canadian Army personnel of World War II
People from Old Toronto
Royal Regiment of Canadian Artillery officers